The 2023 Call of Duty League season is the fourth season of the Call of Duty League, an esports league based on the video game franchise Call of Duty.

Teams

Regular season 
The 2023 CDL season began on December 2, 2022. Teams will compete in five Majors throughout the season, culminating in a final "Champs" tournament. The five Majors will be played in Raleigh, Boston, Arlington, Brooklyn, and an unnamed fifth location.

Standings

Stage 1 
Stage 1 group stage began on December 2, 2022, and ended on December 14.

Group stage

Major
The Stage 1 Major ran from December 14 through December 18, 2022, at the Raleigh Convention Center. All twelve CDL teams, alongside four Challengers teams, competed against each other. The teams were put into four groups of four, with three CDL teams and one Challengers team in each group. Teams played the other three teams in their group once, with the top two from each group advancing to a double elimination bracket.

Group A

Group B

Group C

Group D

Bracket

Stage 2 
Stage 2 group stage began on January 13, 2023, and ended on January 29.

Group stage

Major
The Stage 2 Major ran from February 2 through February 5, 2023. The Major is hosted by Boston Breach.

Stage 3 
Stage 3 group stage begins on February 17, 2023, and ends on March 5.

Group stage

Major
The Stage 3 Major runs from March 9 through March 12, 2023. The Major is hosted by OpTic Texas.

Broadcast and viewership 
In early 2020, Activision Blizzard signed a three-year broadcasting rights deal with YouTube, making the streaming platform the exclusive broadcasting partner for the CDL. The 2023 CDL season marks the first season since the expiration of the deal. In December 2022, the CDL announced that it would be broadcasting the entirety of the season exclusively on Twitch and its official website.

The opening weekend of the 2023 season saw record viewership. The highest viewed match was OpTic Texas versus the Florida Mutineers, which reached a peak of over 190,000 on Twitch. The peak viewership made it the fourth-most watched CDL match of match of all time, only behind the three championship matches from 2020 to 2022.

References

External links
 

Call of Duty League seasons
Call of Duty